Rosa agrestis, the small-leaved sweet briar, field briar or fieldbriar, is a species of wild rose native to Europe, found mostly in southern Europe and occasionally as far as the Caucasus. Sources differ on whether it can be found in northern Africa and Anatolia.

A dog rose, it is in the subgenus Rosa, section Caninae, and subsection Rubigineae. 

It is a close relative of, and very similar to the sweet briar, Rosa rubiginosa, but with smaller leaves, white to blush petals, and very little odor from either the flowers or the leaves. Although it may be cultivated, most gardeners prefer the sweet briar for its scented foliage and pink flowers.

References

agrestis
Flora of Europe
Plants described in 1798